The 2007 NCAA Division III baseball tournament was played at the end of the 2007 NCAA Division III baseball season to determine the 32nd national champion of college baseball at the NCAA Division III level. The tournament concluded with eight teams competing at Time Warner Cable Field at Fox Cities Stadium in Grand Chute, Wisconsin for the championship. Eight regional tournaments were held to determine the participants in the World Series. Regional tournaments were contested in double-elimination format, with three regions consisting of six teams and five consisting of seven, for a total of 53 teams participating in the tournament.

Bids
The 53 competing teams were:

Regionals

Midwest Regional
Witter Field-Wisconsin Rapids, WI (Host: University of Wisconsin-Stevens Point)

South Regional
Panther Field-Ferrum, VA (Host: Ferrum College)

New England Regional
Whitehouse Field-Harwich, MA (Host: Eastern College Athletic Conference)

Central Regional
Jack Horenberger Field-Bloomington, IL (Host: Illinois Wesleyan University)

Mideast Regional
Mills Field-Strongsville, OH (Host: The College of Wooster)

West Regional
W.O. Hart Park-Orange, CA (Host: Chapman University)

New York Regional
Leo Pinckney Field at Falcon Park-Auburn, NY (Host: Ithaca College)

Mid-Atlantic Regional
Boyertown Bear Stadium-Boyertown, PA (Host: Alvernia College/Pennsylvania Athletic Conference)

World Series
Time Warner Cable Field at Fox Cities Stadium-Grand Chute, WI (Host: University of Wisconsin-Oshkosh/Lawrence University)

References

NCAA Division III Baseball Tournament
Tournament